"Accident" is the sixth and final episode of the first series of British sitcom Bottom. It was first broadcast on 22 October 1991. This episode sees the first appearance of Eddie's "real friends" Spudgun (Steven O'Donnell) and Dave Hedgehog (Christopher Ryan).

Synopsis
Richie breaks his leg, but he is determined not to let it spoil his birthday celebrations.

Plot
The episode begins with Eddie sitting down at the breakfast table looking severely hungover. Richie then enters the room in his pyjamas singing "Happy Birthday to Me", much to Eddie's dismay. Richie then begins his annual birthday "routine" of reading what are obviously forged cards, including some supposedly from Sue Carpenter, General Pinochet, Rod Steiger, and "all the lads on the Ark Royal". Eddie claims that the cards are the same ones Richie received every year. One of the cards is from ABBA with "Happy Christmas 1973" written inside. Another appears to be from the people of the Soviet Union "in grateful thanks to comrade Richie". Richie asks Eddie where his birthday gift is and, after annoying Richie with a couple of gag gifts (Richie's comb that he "lost" last week and the TV remote), Eddie hands Richie a piece of paper with the words "Madame Swish 3:30" written on it. Richie, believing it to be a prostitute's card, heaps praise on Eddie and becomes excited at the prospect of finally having sex. However, it soon comes to light that Madame Swish is actually a horse running in the 3:30 race at Kempton. An ungrateful Richie struggles to hide his disappointment, but eventually relents and gives Eddie £20 to put on the horse, with odds of 10/1.

Whilst Richie puts up his birthday decorations, Eddie returns after the big race and successfully fools Richie into thinking that the £20 bet Richie put on the race has left him with £2 in winnings. As Eddie tosses over the winnings, Richie falls off the ladder he is standing on and breaks his leg. Eddie gives assistance, which results in Richie being knocked unconscious before he eventually manages to get to hospital.

Eddie and Richie return from the hospital, with Richie bandaged up and in a wheelchair at 7 p.m., when Richie is expecting his party guests. even though he never bother inviting people at all anyway, because he believes people just turned up and feel like it, rather than confirming invitations these days. As the clock strikes 7 there is a knock at the door – however only Eddie's two "real" friends, Dave Hedgehog and Spudgun, are there. Richie realises he has no friends and invites the pair to stay, following which he insists the group play "Sardines" – a variant of hide-and-seek in which one person hides and the rest have to find him, and when they find him they hide with him. However, being in a wheelchair, Richie needs the other three to hide him in the upstairs cupboard, and they must do so with their eyes closed. Once they have hidden Richie and counted to ten, Eddie, Spudgun, and Dave instead decide to spend the night in front of the television, drinking the liquor Eddie has bought with the winnings he conned Richie out of. Richie is ecstatic after being in the upstairs cupboard for over five hours, believing it to be a world record, but soon after he gets bored and decides to rejoin them downstairs. Due to his immobility, Richie falls down the stairs, crashing through the bathroom door breaking his other leg, much to the amusement of the other three. A drunken Spudgun then vomits on and accidentally falls on top of the injured Richie.

Richie's second mishap just so happens to occur at the same time as last orders at the local pub, so Eddie invites the regulars around for a quick party. Eddie amuses the crowd by doing impersonations of Richie. Richie (now with both legs in casts) then enters the room, although he is oblivious to Eddie's mockery of him. After Eddie convinces him that all of his friends have turned up for his party after all, Richie cheers up and attempts to boss over the activities. After attempting to divest a female guest of her blouse, he is stopped by her boyfriend, who then proceeds to get everyone together to give Richie the bumps. As they all throw him into the air, Richie hits the ceiling and his casts shatter, ending the episode with a close-up of him screaming in pain.

Continuity and production errors
Eddie tries to put Richie's leg back in place by tying the leg to the door with string, and slams the door. As he does this, the string pulls Richie and he hits the door. If watching in slow motion, once the door is slammed, Richie's jeans rip, revealing the fake leg, and Mayall's real leg behind it. Continuing in slow motion, a trolley can be seen under Richie as he is pulled across the floor.
 Eddie, Hedgehog and Spudgun help Richie get up the stairs in his wheelchair to play Sardines. When Spudgun leans on the wall, the whole stage shakes.
 It is often stated, notably in the stage shows, that Eddie is unable to read or write. However, in this episode, he is seen to write "I'm sorry, I'm a twat... ten times." The show seemed to have three different timelines: one for the series, one for the stage shows, and one for Guest House Paradiso, where the characters have different surnames.
 Eddie, Hedgehog and Spudgun end up watching Eddie's Emmerdale Farm compilation on video. However, Eddie does not install a VCR until "Carnival", the final episode of series three. It could however be implied, that the TV set in this episode was later destroyed in "Culture", and then replaced by a TV set without one. As it was rented from Rumbelows (as mentioned in the same episode), a technician could have set it up for them.

Trivia
 Richie claims at one point that he "doesn't have time to put on (his) girl-bait underpants". This is a reference to The Young Ones episode "Summer Holiday", where it is revealed that Rik Mayall's character Rick also owns a similar pair of pants.
 The only episode of the first series that does not end with Eddie being injured, and the second where Richie is hurt (both Eddie and Richie are attacked by Mr. Rottweiler in Gas).

References

External links

1991 British television episodes
Bottom (TV series)
Television episodes about birthdays